UFC Fight Night: Rothwell vs. dos Santos (also known as UFC Fight Night 86) was a mixed martial arts event held on April 10, 2016, at the Arena Zagreb in Zagreb, Croatia.

Background
The event was the first that the organization has hosted in Croatia.

A heavyweight bout between Ben Rothwell and former UFC Heavyweight Champion Junior dos Santos served as the event headliner.

Bartosz Fabiński was expected to face Nicolas Dalby at the event. However, on March 2, Fabiński was removed from the card due to undisclosed reasons and was replaced by Zak Cummings.

Ruslan Magomedov was expected to face former heavyweight title challenger Gabriel Gonzaga at the event, but pulled out on March 9 due to a knee injury. Gonzaga faced Derrick Lewis instead.

Promotional newcomer Bojan Mihajlović was expected to face Francis Ngannou at the event. However, Mihajlović was removed from the card on March 14 due to undisclosed reasons and was replaced by fellow promotional newcomer Curtis Blaydes.

Results

Bonus awards
The following fighters were awarded $50,000 bonuses:
Fight of the Night: None awarded
Performance of the Night: Derrick Lewis, Alejandro Pérez, Mairbek Taisumov and Jared Cannonier

See also
List of UFC events
2016 in UFC

References

UFC Fight Night
2016 in mixed martial arts
Mixed martial arts in Croatia
Sport in Zagreb
2016 in Croatian sport
April 2016 sports events in Europe